Brenson S. Wase (born 28 May 1952) is a Marshallese politician and a long-time member of the cabinet and senator in Nitijela. 

Wase was born in Arno Atoll in 1952. He has a degree in business administration. 

He was first elected in 1983 as senator from Arno Atoll. He was appointed by President Amata Kabua as Minister of Social Services in January 1984. In 1987 he was appointed as Minister of Resources and Development. Wase switched his constituency to Majuro Atoll in the 1999 general elections. Wase has been Minister of Finance of the Marshall Islands from 2004 to 2008, from 2016 to 2020, and since October 2021.

References

1952 births
Living people
Finance ministers of the Marshall Islands
Social affairs ministers of the Marshall Islands
Members of the Legislature of the Marshall Islands
University of Hawaiʻi alumni
People from the Ratak Chain